Farhad Sahib oghlu Abdullayev (5 December 1958, Baku)- Azerbaijani lawyer, Doctor of Law, Chairman of the Constitutional Court of the Republic of Azerbaijan (since 2003)

Biography 
Farhad Abdullayev was born in December 5, 1958 in Baku. In 1965 he entered the secondary school No. 189 in Baku and graduated from the same school in 1975. In 1975 – 1980, he studied at the Faculty of Law at the Moscow State University named after M. V. Lomonosov.

In 1980, Farhad Abdullayev was appointed by postgraduate work assignment to the Supreme Court of the Republic of Azerbaijan. He started his work as Adviser then as Senior Adviser, and in 1985 he was appointed to the post of Head of Department of Supreme Court. In 1990 he was elected to the post of the Judge of the Supreme Court of the Republic of Azerbaijan by the Supreme Council of the Republic of Azerbaijan and remained on this post till 2000. On August 28, 2000, he was appointed as a Deputy Chairman of the Court of Appeal of the Republic of Azerbaijan.

After the approval of Milli Majlis (Parliament) of the Republic of Azerbaijan, by the Decree of the President of the Republic of Azerbaijan dated of June 25, 2003, Farhad Abdullayev was appointed to the post of Chairman of the Constitutional Court of the Republic of Azerbaijan.

After the approval of Milli Majlis (Parliament) of the Republic of Azerbaijan, by the Order of the President of the Republic of Azerbaijan dated of June 24, 2013, he was reappointed to the post of Chairman of the Constitutional Court of the Republic of Azerbaijan.

Along with participation in the implementation of justice in the Republic of Azerbaijan, he took direct part in drafting of a number of legislative and other acts.

Farhad Abdullayev is engaged in pedagogical and scientific activities. He is a Doctor of Law. He is a member of the Commission on Combating Corruption of the Republic of Azerbaijan.

He is married and has two children.

Awards 

 The Order of the President of the Republic of Azerbaijan on awarding with a title “The Honoured Lawyer”, dated of July 16, 2009.
 The Order of the President of the Republic of Azerbaijan on awarding "Shohrat" Order, dated of December 5, 2018.
 The Order of the President of the Republic of Azerbaijan on awarding the jubilee medal “100th Anniversary of the Azerbaijan Democratic Republic (1918-2018)”, dated of May 27, 2019.
 The Decree of the President of the Republic of Kazakhstan on awarding "Достык" (Friendship) Order of the II degree for services in strengthening cooperation between states, dated of August 12, 2020.

Publications 

 "Apellyasiya Məhkəməsində cinayət mühakimə icraatının təkmilləşdirilməsi problemləri" 2005-ci il ("Problems of improvement of criminal proceedings in the Court of Appeal", 2005)
 "Azərbaycan Respublikasında Konstitusiya icraatının nəzəri və praktiki problemləri" 2009-cu il ("Conceptual and practical problems of constitutional proceedings in the Republic of Azerbaijan", 2009)
 "Azərbaycan Respublikası Konstitusiya Məhkəməsinin Hüquqi Mövqeləri" 2013-cü il ("Legal positions of the Constitutional Court of the Republic of Azerbaijan", 2013)
 "Azərbaycan Respublikası Konstitusiya Məhkəməsinin Hüquqi Mövqeləri" 2018-ci il (2 hissəli) ("Legal positions of the Constitutional Court of the Republic of Azerbaijan ", 2018 (2 parts))
 "Legal Positions of the Constitutional Court of the Republic of Azerbaijan" 2018 (Eng)

References 
1.    "Farhad Abdullayev — Chairman". http://constcourt.gov.az/structure/19 Constitutional Court of Azerbaijan. Archived from the original on 18 November 2020. Retrieved on 18 November 2020.

2.   "The Order of the President of the Republic of Azerbaijan on appointment of F. S. Abdullayev to the post of Deputy Chairman of the Court of Appeal of the Republic of Azerbaijan." http://e-qanun.az/. 28 August 2000. Retrieved on 18 November 2020.

3.   " The Decree of the President of the Republic of Azerbaijan on appointment of F. S. Abdullayev to the post of the Chairman of the Constitutional Court of the Republic of Azerbaijan." http://e-qanun.az/. 25 June 2003. Retrieved on 18 November 2020.

4.    " The Order of the President of the Republic of Azerbaijan on appointment of F. S. Abdullayev to the post of the Chairman of the Constitutional Court of the Republic of Azerbaijan.". https://president.az/. 24 June 2013. Archived from the original on 18 November 2020. Retrieved on 18 November 2020.

5.   " The Order of the President of the Republic of Azerbaijan on awarding F. S. Abdullayev with a title “The Honoured Lawyer”. http://e-qanun.az/. 16 July 2009. Retrieved on 18 November 2020.

6.   " The Order of the President of the Republic of Azerbaijan on awarding "Shohrat" Order to F. S. Abdullayev ".https://president.az/ 5 December 2018. Archived from the original on 18 November 2020. Retrieved on 18 November 2020.

1958 births
Recipients of the Shohrat Order
Azerbaijani judges
20th-century Azerbaijani lawyers
Living people
People from Baku
Moscow State University alumni
Recipients of the Azerbaijan Democratic Republic 100th anniversary medal